Angus Kennedy, 6th Marquess of Ailsa (28 October 1882 – 31 May 1957) was a Scottish peer, the son of Archibald Kennedy, 3rd Marquess of Ailsa. He was known as Lord Angus Kennedy until 1956. He was educated at Eton College. He gained the rank of lieutenant in the Royal Naval Volunteer Reserve and the rank of captain in the Royal Air Force.

He married Gertrude Millicent Cooper (daughter of Gervas Weir Cooper, of Wordwell Hall, Bury St Edmunds, Suffolk) on 28 January 1922 and they had one child:
Archibald Kennedy, 7th Marquess of Ailsa (1925–1994)

Archibald Angus Charles Kennedy, 6th Marquess of Ailsa succeeded to the titles of 17th Earl of Cassilis, 19th Lord Kennedy, 6th Marquess of Ailsa & 6th Baron Ailsa on 1 June 1956.

References

External links

1882 births
1957 deaths
People educated at Eton College
Royal Air Force officers
Royal Navy officers
Angus
Scottish people of Dutch descent
Schuyler family
Van Cortlandt family
6